Velardemyia is a genus of parasitic flies in the family Tachinidae.

Species
Velardemyia ica Valencia, 1972

Distribution
Chile, Peru

References

Diptera of South America
Dexiinae
Tachinidae genera
Monotypic Brachycera genera